Kadambini Mohakud is an Indian cricketer. She is a right-handed batsman and plays for Odisha and East Zone. She has played First-class, List A and  Women's Twenty20.

Early life 
Mohakud was born in 1982 in Gudianali, Dhenkanal district of Odisha to Madan Mohan Mohakud and Basanti Mohakud. She was graduated in Arts from Dhenkanal College (Utkal University).

References 

1982 births
Living people
People from Dhenkanal
Cricketers from Odisha
Sportswomen from Odisha
Odisha women cricketers
East Zone women cricketers
Indian women cricketers